Silchar Part-X is a census town in Cachar district in the Indian state of Assam.

Demographics
 India census, Silchar Part-X had a population of 5313. Males constitute 52% of the population and females 48%. Silchar Part-X has an average literacy rate of 66%, higher than the national average of 59.5%: male literacy is 80%, and female literacy is 51%. In Silchar Part-X, 15% of the population is under 6 years of age.

References

Cities and towns in Cachar district
Silchar